Espíritu Santo (Spanish: Iglesia Parroquial del Espíritu Santo) is a Roman Catholic parish church located in Riópar, province of Albacete, Castilla-La Mancha, Spain.

A church at the site was likely erected after the conquest of the region by the Christians in the 14th-century, however this church is not documented until 1475. The style mingles gothic and mudejar elements.

It was declared Bien de Interés Cultural in 1981.

References 

Espiritu Santo
Bien de Interés Cultural landmarks in the Province of Albacete
15th-century Roman Catholic church buildings in Spain